Gibberella pulicaris is a fungal plant pathogen infecting several hosts including potato, strawberry, hop, alfalfa and Douglas-fir.

Synonyms 
 Sphaeria pulicaris Fr., Mykologische Hefte 2: 37 (1823) [MB#239256]
 Gibbera pulicaris (Fr.) Fr., Summa vegetabilium Scandinaviae 2: 402 (1849) [MB#190097]
 Botryosphaeria pulicaris (Fr.) Ces. & De Not. (1863) [MB#184344]
 Nectria pulicaris (Fr.) Tul. & C. Tul., Selecta Fungorum Carpologia: Nectriei- Phacidiei- Pezizei 3: 63 (1865) [MB#465479]
 Cucurbitaria pulicaris (Fr.) Quél., Mémoires de la Société d'Émulation de Montbéliard sér. 2, 5: 511 (1875) [MB#504675]
 Sphaeria cyanogena Desm., Annales des Sciences Naturelles Botanique sér. 3, 10: 352 (1848) [MB#199264]

References 
http://www.mycobank.org/Biolomics.aspx?Table=Mycobank&MycoBankNr_=211541

External links 
 Index Fungorum
 USDA ARS Fungal Database

pulicaris
Fungal plant pathogens and diseases
Food plant pathogens and diseases
Fungal conifer pathogens and diseases
Fungal strawberry diseases
Potato diseases
Fungi described in 1877
Taxa named by Elias Magnus Fries